Ray or Raymond Brown may refer to:

Music
 Ray Brown (musician) (1926–2002), American jazz double bassist
 Raymond Harry Brown (born 1946), American jazz trumpeter with Stan Kenton big band
 Ray Brown Jr. (born 1949), American jazz and blues pianist and singer
 Raymond Lee Brown, American trumpeter, Earth, Wind, & Fire
 Ray Brown & the Whispers, 1960s Australian rock band with a singer Ray Brown
 Raymond Brown (musician), former bassist of American band This Will Destroy You

Sports
 Ray Brown (National League pitcher) (1889–1955), baseball pitcher for Chicago Cubs in 1909
 Ray Brown (Negro leagues pitcher) (1908–1965), Negro league baseball pitcher
 Ray Brown (cricketer) (born 1950), Australian cricketer
 Ray Brown (footballer) (1928–2005), English footballer
 Ray Brown (American football, born 1936) (1936–2017), professional American football defensive back and quarterback
 Ray Brown (offensive lineman) (born 1962), offensive guard for the Washington Redskins
 Ray Brown (safety) (born 1949), defensive back for the Atlanta Falcons
 Ray Brown (rugby league) (born 1957),  Australian rugby footballer for Western Suburbs, Manly, New South Wales
 Ray Brown (runner) (born 1961), American middle-distance runner
 Ray Brown (wrestler) (born 1943), Australian Olympic wrestler
 Raymond Brown (basketball) (born 1965), American basketball player
 Raymond Brown (swimmer) (born 1969), Canadian swimmer

Other
 Raymond A. Brown (1915–2009), American civil rights lawyer
 Raymond E. Brown (1928–1998), biblical scholar and Roman Catholic priest in the United States
 Raymond Frederick Brown (1920–1991), English industrialist, founder of Racal
 Ray Brown (designer) (born 1959), Australian clothing designer
 Raymond Brown, pleaded guilty for criminal conspiracy to commit second degree murder, see 2003 John McDonogh High School shooting

See also
 Raymond Brown Hesselyn (1921–1963), New Zealand fighter in World War II
 Raymond L. Brown (disambiguation)